Trithemis africana, the western phantom dropwing,  is a species of dragonfly in the family Libellulidae. It is found in Western and Central Africa, in Cameroon, Sierra Leone, Liberia, and Cote d'Ivoire.

References

africana
Insects described in 1867